Let's Dance 2015 is the tenth season of the Swedish celebrity dancing show Let's Dance, which was broadcast on TV4 and presented by David Hellenius and Jessica Almenäs.

Couples

Scoring chart

Average chart

Average dance chart

Songs

Week 1
Individual judges scores in charts below (given in parentheses) are listed in this order from left to right: Dermot Clemenger, Ann Wilson and Tony Irving.

Running order

Week 2
Individual judges scores in charts below (given in parentheses) are listed in this order from left to right: Dermot Clemenger, Ann Wilson and Tony Irving.

Running order

Week 3
Individual judges scores in charts below (given in parentheses) are listed in this order from left to right: Dermot Clemenger, Ann Wilson and Tony Irving.

Running order

Week 4
Individual judges scores in charts below (given in parentheses) are listed in this order from left to right: Dermot Clemenger, Ann Wilson and Tony Irving.

Running order

Week 5
Individual judges scores in charts below (given in parentheses) are listed in this order from left to right: Dermot Clemenger, Ann Wilson and Tony Irving.

Running order

Week 6
Individual judges scores in charts below (given in parentheses) are listed in this order from left to right: Dermot Clemenger, Ann Wilson and Tony Irving.

Running order

Week 7
Individual judges scores in charts below (given in parentheses) are listed in this order from left to right: Dermot Clemenger, Ann Wilson and Tony Irving.

Running order

Week 8

Individual judges scores in charts below (given in parentheses) are listed in this order from left to right: Dermot Clemenger, Ann Wilson and Tony Irving.
Running order

Week 9

Individual judges scores in charts below (given in parentheses) are listed in this order from left to right: Dermot Clemenger, Ann Wilson and Tony Irving.
Running order

Dance chart

 Highest Scoring Dance
 Lowest Scoring Dance

References

2015
TV4 (Sweden) original programming
2015 Swedish television seasons